The women's 80 metres hurdles event at the 1967 Pan American Games was held in Winnipeg on 4 and 5 August. It was the last time that this event was held before being replaced with 100 metres hurdles.

Medalists

Results

Heats
Wind:Heat 1: -1.0 m/s, Heat 2: -0.7 m/s

Final
Wind: +1.8 m/s

References

Athletics at the 1967 Pan American Games
1967